Matthews Winery is a winery near Woodinville, Washington, USA. It specializes in wines using the Bordeaux grape varietals: Cabernet Sauvignon, Merlot, Cabernet Franc, and Petit Verdot.

In 2016, the Matthews Claret made Wine Spectator's Top 100 List — as the 27th best wine in the world.

History
The winery was founded in 1992.

Wines

Matthews makes two white wines — the Sauvignon Blanc and the Reserve Sauvignon Blanc. It also produces four separate Bordeaux-style red blends — the Claret, the Merlot, the Cabernet Sauvignon, and the Reserve Claret.

Wineries in Woodinville, Washington